Bigg Boss Marathi 1 is the first season of the Marathi version of the reality television show Bigg Boss broadcast in India. The grand premiere was held on 15 April 2018 on Colors Marathi and Mahesh Manjrekar hosted this season of the show. For this season of Bigg Boss, a lavish house set has been constructed in Lonavla. The Grand Finale aired on 22 July 2018 and Megha Dhade was declared as the winner and Pushkar Jog as the Runner-up.

Housemates status

Housemates

Original entrants
The housemates in the alphabetical order:

 Aarti Solanki - Comedian who participating the comedy reality show Fu Bai Fu and the dancing reality show Eka Peksha Ek.
 Aastad Kale - Television actor who has appeared in television show Pudhcha Paaul.
 Anil Thatte - Journalist. 
 Bhushan Kadu - Comedian and actor who appeared in the Marathi reality show Comedy Express.
 Jui Gadkari - Television actress who was in the television show Pudhcha Paaul.
 Megha Dhade - Film actress who has appeared in several Marathi films, including Superstar. She also participated in the Marathi reality show Zhunj Marathmoli.
 Pushkar Jog - Film actor and producer who participated in Marathi Dancing reality shows.
 Rajesh Shringarpure - Film and television actor. who acted in many Marathi films, including Zenda, Swarajya and Television serials.
 Resham Tipnis - Film and television actress who has appeared in many Marathi and Bollywood Films. She also did a small role in Bollywood Movie Baazigar.
 Rutuja Dharmadhikari - Television actress who rose to fame after her performance in a Marathi horror show Ratris Khel Chale.
 Sai Lokur - Film actress and model. She is known for her role in Bollywood film Kis Kisko Pyaar Karoon alongside Kapil Sharma. 
 Smita Gondkar - Film actress, model and Stunt rider who rose to fame after her appearance in Marathi music video Pappi De Paarula.
 Sushant Shelar - Film actor who did many Marathi Plays and Films.
 Usha Nadkarni - Film and television actress.who has appeared in Marathi and Bollywood films. She is known for her Performance in Hindi daily soap Pavitra Rishta.
 Vineet Bhonde - Television actor who appeared in Marathi comedy show Chala Hawa Yeu Dya.

Wild-Card entrants
 Sharmishtha Raut - Television actress. She mainly acted in Marathi television serials. 
 Tyagraj Khadilkar - an actor and singer
 Nandkishor Chaughule - an actor and comedian.

Guest entrant
 Harshada Khanvilkar - Television actress. She is known for her performance in Pudhcha Paaul as Akkasaheb. She was guest for 1 week.

Guest appearances

Special episode (4 hours) 
 15 April 2018
 22 July 2018

Nominations table

Notes
  indicates the House Captain.
  indicates that the Housemate was directly nominated for eviction prior to the regular nominations process.
  indicates that the Housemate was granted immunity from nominations.
  indicates that the Housemate was in the Secret Room.
: On Day 1, housemates had to choose 4 housemates for being the House Captain. In the task, Vineet won the House Captain title, Sai won Immunity & Anil was directly nominated.
: On Day 7, Aarti had a power to give immunity to one housemate for the next week. She chose Usha to be immune.
: On Day 22, Rajesh was fake evicted and moved to the secret room.
: Nomination was a part of a task.
: Housemates had to mutually decide to nominate 5 housemates for eviction.
: Harshada stayed for a week as a Guest.
: Voting lines were closed for the week, as Rutuja walked due to illness.
: On Day 52, Sushant walked from the house due to illness.
: This week, House Captain had a special power to directly nominate one housemate for eviction. Sai chose to nominate Smita.
: This week the voting lines are closed.
: Prior to the nomination. Both wild-cards Nandkishor & Sharmishtha were given a secret task. If they succeeded, they will be immune from nomination, but both of them failed and they were directly nominated for eviction.
: For this week, Public voted to win and not to save.

References

External links
 Bigg Boss Marathi 1 at Facebook
 Bigg Boss Marathi 1 at Voot
 

2018 Indian television seasons
01
Marathi-language television shows
Colors Marathi original programming